Mensur Limani (born 4 December 1985 in Bujanovac, nowadays Serbia) is a Kosovar Albanian international footballer who most recently played for Kosovan side Drita.

International career
Limani was part of the Kosovo team that played at the 2005 Northern Cyprus National Games tournament.

Club statistics (incomplete)

Honours

Club
Albanian Supercup
Winner: 1 – 2012 with KF Tirana
Winner:1 
2004 with Kf Drita

References

Notes

1984 births
Living people
People from Bujanovac
Association football midfielders
Kosovan footballers
Serbian footballers
FC Drita players
FK Bashkimi players
FK Milano Kumanovo players
FC Prishtina players
KF Drenica players
AZAL PFK players
KF Tirana players
Football Superleague of Kosovo players
Macedonian First Football League players
Kategoria Superiore players
Serbian expatriate footballers
Kosovan expatriate footballers
Expatriate footballers in North Macedonia
Kosovan expatriate sportspeople in North Macedonia
Expatriate footballers in Azerbaijan
Kosovan expatriate sportspeople in Azerbaijan
Expatriate footballers in Albania
Kosovan expatriate sportspeople in Albania